Jean Sendy (1910–1978) was a French writer and translator, author of works on esoterica and UFO phenomena. He was also an early proponent of the ancient astronaut hypothesis.

Ancient astronauts
He wrote the 1968 book The moon: The key to the Bible in which he claimed the word "Elohim" mentioned in the Hebrew Genesis of the Bible, which is usually translated as God, should in fact be translated in the plural as "Gods" because the singular of the word Elohim is Eloah. He claimed that the "Gods" were actually space travelers (an alien race of humanoids). Sendy believed that Genesis was factual history of ancient astronauts colonizing earth who became "angels in human memory". The book contains many ideas later found in the UFO religion Raëlism.

In his 1969 book Those Gods who made Heaven and Earth, Sendy claimed that space travelers 23,500 years ago arrived in the Solar System in a large hollow sphere and seeded humanity.

List of works
La lune: Clé de la Bible (translated in English The moon: The key to the Bible) (1968) later edition (1974)
Those Gods Who Made Heaven & Earth; the novel of the Bible (1969) later edition (1972) 
The Coming of the Gods (1970) later edition (1973) 
Moon Outpost Of Gods (1975)

Public lectures
 Premier Congres National de Science-Fiction – Clermont-Ferrand, France, March 1–10, 1974

See also
Morris Jessup
Paul Misraki

References

External links
“A Gentleman’s Joyous Esotericism: Jean Sendy Above and Beyond the ‘Ancient Aliens’” Scholarly essay by Stefano Bigliardi about Jean Sendy's life and work
Jean Sendy's Books 

Ancient astronauts proponents
UFO writers
French male non-fiction writers
1910 births
1978 deaths
20th-century French male writers